Emmanuel "Manny" Oudin (born March 20, 1968 in France) is the former head soccer coach of the Lehigh University women's soccer team.  Oudin finished his career at Lehigh after eight seasons ending in 2009. He previously had an extensive playing and coaching career both at the collegiate and professional levels.  He played as a defender both indoors and out, winning the 1995 National Professional Soccer League with the Cleveland Crunch.  He also coached at the high school, college and professional levels before becoming head coach at Lehigh University.

Youth
Oudin graduated from Lenape Valley High School in Stanhope, New Jersey and attended East Stroudsburg University, playing on the men's soccer team from 1985 to 1988. He graduated with a bachelor's degree in physical education in 1991.  In 1993, he signed with the Cleveland Crunch of the National Professional Soccer League (NPSL).  That season the Crunch won the NPSL title.  In 1994, he moved to the Harrisburg Heat, remaining with the team through the 1995–1996 season.  At some point, probably in 1996, Oudin played for the Delaware Wizards of USISL.  In 1997, he signed with the Hershey Wildcats.  This brought him back to eastern Pennsylvania, an area he had lived in during college and an area he would make home for the rest of his career.  Oudin played the 1997 and 1998 seasons with the Wildcats.  In the fall of 1998, he signed with the local Philadelphia KiXX of the NPSL.  In 1999, he returned to the USISL, this time with the Lehigh Valley Steam where he was both a player and assistant coach.  The Steam folded at the end of the season and Oudin moved to the Reading Rage of the USL Pro Select League, playing with the Rage until 2003 when he retired from playing professionally.

Coach
Oudin began his coaching career as an assistant with the East Stroudsburg University men's team from 1989 to 1992.  In 1992, he also became an assistant with the women's soccer team, a position he held through 1993.  In 1997, he became the head coach of both the boy's and girl's teams at the Moravian Academy, a private primary/secondary school in Bethlehem, Pennsylvania.  In 1999, Oudin served as an assistant coach, as well as player, for the Lehigh Valley Steam.  He then served as an assistant coach with the Reading Rage from 2001 to 2003.  On September 21, 2003, Lehigh University announced the hiring of Oudin as the head coach of its women's soccer team. Manny finished his career at Lehigh University after the 2009–2010 season.

References

External links
 Lehigh University

1968 births
Living people
American soccer coaches
American soccer players
National Professional Soccer League (1984–2001) players
Cleveland Crunch players
East Stroudsburg Warriors men's soccer players
Harrisburg Heat players
Philadelphia KiXX players
USISL players
Lehigh Mountain Hawks coaches
Delaware Wizards players
Hershey Wildcats players
Reading United A.C. players
Lehigh Valley Steam players
College women's soccer coaches in the United States
Soccer players from New Jersey
Sportspeople from Burlington County, New Jersey
Association football defenders